James Seymour Waddington (November 12, 1831 – 1917) was a member of the Wisconsin State Senate.

He was born in Chautauqua County, New York. He moved to Wiota, Wisconsin in 1841 before moving to Belvidere, Illinois in 1844 and to Argyle, Wisconsin in 1848.

Career
Waddington was a member of the Senate representing the 12th district. Previously, he was a Lafayette County, Wisconsin judge from 1878 to 1882. He was a Republican.

References

1831 births
1917 deaths
People from Chautauqua County, New York
People from Argyle, Wisconsin
People from Belvidere, Illinois
Wisconsin state court judges
Republican Party Wisconsin state senators
19th-century American judges